Percy Griffith Davies, QC (October 29, 1902 – January 26, 1992) was a barrister and a Canadian federal politician.

Davies ran in a by-election after the death of incumbent John Francis Buckley on March 21, 1932. He won the hotly contested election and came out on top of a field of 4 candidates. Davies served out his term and did not run again in 1935.

External links
 

1902 births
1992 deaths
Members of the House of Commons of Canada from Alberta
Conservative Party of Canada (1867–1942) MPs
Canadian King's Counsel